Rodrigo Ruiz (21 September 1929 – 17 June 2014) was a Costa Rican sports shooter. He competed at the 1968 Summer Olympics and the 1980 Summer Olympics.

References

1929 births
2014 deaths
Costa Rican male sport shooters
Olympic shooters of Costa Rica
Shooters at the 1968 Summer Olympics
Shooters at the 1980 Summer Olympics
People from Cartago Province